San Jorge is a municipality on Lake Nicaragua in the Rivas department of Nicaragua.

Municipalities of the Rivas Department